Lost After Dark is a 2015 Canadian horror film starring Robert Patrick.

Plot

The action begins in 1977 Michigan at a run-down farm house where a man shouts for a young woman to run as he is attacked inside. She escapes from the house and runs into the surrounding wooded area. She attempts to hide but finds a body hung from a tree and flees in terror. Soon she is caught by a disheveled man who forces her head into a bear trap as blood splatters across his face.

The movie then switches to Broomfield, Michigan in 1984 where we are introduced to Adrienne who is packing up a suitcase for a weekend away with her friends after the Spring Ball. She and her father are clearly close and he says he is happy to see her enjoying life since her mother passed away and sister went missing. He then drops her off at the ball.

At school, Adrienne meets up with her best friend Jamie and talks about her crush Sean, while three other students Wesley, Tobe and Sean break into and hotwire a school bus. We then see the school vice principal, Mr. Cunningham escorting a rebelliously dressed girl, Marilyn, out of the dance for inappropriate clothing.

The three students manage to start the bus and pick up Adrienne, Jamie and the snotty Heather along with her obnoxious boyfriend Johnnie and finally Marilyn and speed off just as the principal arrives outside.

Soon the bus runs out of gas and as the guys argue about what to do next Adrienne, Marilyn and Jamie go into the woods to change and are watched by a heavy breathing stranger. Heather also reveals she has brought her pet dog Precious along much to Johnnie's annoyance.

Johnnie then forces Tobe to go walking to find gas for the bus while the others stay behind, too scared he refuses but when Marilyn, who Tobe has a crush on,  offers to go with him and the two bond as they walk and smoke until they run into a mailbox, which says Joad and a pathway leading to the house from the beginning of the movie. They return to the others at the bus and they all decide to head to the house.

Meanwhile the vice principal arrives as Adrienne's house and tells her father she was with the group who stole the bus and they decide to search for them.

The friends reach the old farm house and decide to split into smaller groups to look around for anything useful at which point while getting intimate Johnnie and Heather find a shrine made of human skulls and bones. Heather screams out in horror and everyone rushes to her aid including a stoned Marilyn - leaving Tobe in the barn where he is attacked.

As Wesley inspects the shrine he realizes he's been told about this place and to avoid it as the previous inhabitants the Joad family turned feral and began cannibalising anyone who stumbled upon their land. As which point Adrienne recognises a necklace on the bones that belong to her sister. The group notice Tobe is missing and come together to go find him and get back to the bus.

They find Tobe hung up on the barn door with barbwire in agony, in horror Adrienne runs to help him and the killer steps out and stabs her in the gut with a pickaxe, killing her. The group retreat to the farmhouse to form a plan while the killer drags Adrienne's body to an unknown location and begins butchering her and eating her flesh.

The remaining group decide to make a stand in the house and guard all windows and doors. As Sean, Marilyn and Jamie search the basement they find Adrienne's remains and are attacked by the killer with Sean attempting to fight the man off as the girls escape. After a scuffle, Sean is killed when the killer brutally stabs him with a garden tool.

The survivors run from the house to the barn and find Tobe still barely alive, he begs them to put him out of his misery but the killer arrives and the group scatter at which point the killer follows Jamie who suddenly falls victim to a bear trap, as the killer approaches the movie stops and the screen reads 'REEL MISSING'.

The movie starts up again with the killer, disorientated and stumbling in the woods clutching his bloodied head, although he seems to enjoy the taste of his own blood. He screams in anger.

Wesley and Marilyn are back in the house and as they check the windows and doors the killer smashes through a window and pulls Wesley into the glass killing him instantly as Marilyn flees. Next, we find Johnnie and Heather searching the barn for a hiding place, they find Tobe now dead and hide inside an old car with a tarp covering it. Once inside Heather becomes upset and her dog, sensing its owner's distress begins to whine. Johnnie demands she keep the dog quiet and Heather cruelly breaks the poor animal's neck. Soon after she is slaughtered when the killer stabs her in the back with a pitchfork and when Johnnie attempts to escape beneath the car the killer crushes him.

On the road, Mr. Cunningham finds the bus which has been trashed and he heads for the farm house. The last two survivors Marilyn and Jamie run into each other moments before the killer arrives and slams Marilyn's head against a tree killing her.

Jamie runs and finds Mr. Cunningham arriving at the house and she begs him to help her, she tries to persuade him to escape with her but he refuses to believe everyone is dead. The killer arrives and he instructs Jamie to go inside the house while he takes on the killer. Mr. Cunningham boasts he survived Vietnam and killed many men and will happily kill another.

Inside the house, Jamie hears fighting and after a few moments, the door swings open and the killer throws the vice principal's head inside. Jamie flees upstairs and finds Adrienne's skinless head now amongst the shrine. She escapes from a window climbs into Mr. Cunningham's car which the killer has damaged, she searches for a weapon and finds a full gas can, she then retreats to the bus and fills it to escape but finds the keys missing - she is soon attacked by the killer but Adrienne's father arrives and Jamie manages to fight back and push the killer from the bus and Adrienne's dad shoots him dead.

Later the police arrive and the Sheriff inspects the killer's body before it is taken away and then explains to another officer that the Joad family terrorized the area years ago, murdering countless people and were only stopped when the whole family were killed in a shoot out with the police and that the killer was the family's youngest son Junior.

Just down the road, Jamie is being taken to hospital when the ambulance encounters the coroner's van crashed on the side of the road with the driver's dead body slumped against the wheel, Jamie screams in terror as the movie ends.

Cast
 Elise Gatien as Jamie
 Eve Harlow as Marilyn
 Alexander Calvert as Johnnie
 Jesse Camacho as Tobe
 Stephan James as Wesley
 Justin Kelly as Sean
 Lanie McAuley as Heather
 Kendra Leigh Timmins as Adrienne
 Mark Wiebe as Junior Joad
 Robert Patrick as Mr. C
 David Lipper as Adrienne's Father
 Sarah Fisher as Laurie
 Rick Rosenthal as Sheriff
 Mike Dagostino as Deputy

Filming
Lost After Dark was filmed at locations around Greater Sudbury and Parry Sound, Ontario.

References

External links
 
 

2015 films
2010s slasher films
Canadian slasher films
English-language Canadian films
Films shot in Greater Sudbury
2010s English-language films
2010s Canadian films